In 2005, The New York Times obtained a 2,000-page United States Army investigatory report concerning the homicides of two unarmed civilian Afghan prisoners by U.S. military personnel in December 2002 at the Bagram Theater Internment Facility (also Bagram Collection Point or B.C.P.) in Bagram, Afghanistan and general treatment of prisoners. The two prisoners, Habibullah and Dilawar, were repeatedly chained to the ceiling and beaten, resulting in their deaths. Military coroners ruled that both the prisoners' deaths were homicides. Autopsies revealed severe trauma to both prisoners' legs, describing the trauma as comparable to being run over by a bus. Seven soldiers were charged in 2005.

Location
The alleged torture and homicides took place at the military detention center known as the Bagram Theater Internment Facility, which had been built by the Soviets as an aircraft machine shop during the Soviet invasion of Afghanistan (1980–1989). A concrete-and-sheet metal facility that was retrofitted with wire pens and wooden isolation cells, the center is part of Bagram Air Base in the ancient city of Bagram near Charikar in Parvan, Afghanistan.

Detainees
In January 2010, the American military released the names of 645 detainees held at the main detention center at Bagram, modifying its long-held position against publicizing such information. This was to comply with a Freedom of Information Act lawsuit filed in September 2009 by the American Civil Liberties Union, whose lawyers had also demanded detailed information about conditions, rules and regulations at the center.

Victims

Habibullah

Habibullah died on December 4, 2002. Several U.S. soldiers hit the chained man with so-called "peroneal strikes," or severe blows to the side of the leg above the knee. This incapacitates the leg by hitting the common peroneal nerve. According to The New York Times:

When medics arrived, they found Habibullah dead.

Dilawar

Dilawar, who died on December 10, 2002, was a 22-year-old Afghan taxi driver and farmer who weighed 122 pounds and was described by his interpreters as neither violent nor aggressive.

When beaten, he repeatedly cried "Allah!" The outcry appears to have amused U.S. military personnel. The act of striking him in order to provoke a scream of "Allah!" eventually "became a kind of running joke," according to one of the MPs. "People kept showing up to give this detainee a common peroneal strike just to hear him scream out 'Allah,'" he said. "It went on over a 24-hour period, and I would think that it was over 100 strikes."

The Times reported that:

In the documentary Taxi to the Dark Side (2007), directed by American filmmaker Alex Gibney, there was a claim that Dilawar was captured while driving through militia territory, not going past Bagram air base. The militia stopped him at a roadblock and transferred him to the U.S. Army for a monetary reward, claiming he was a terrorist.

Aafia Siddiqui/Prisoner 650

Aafia Siddiqui, a Pakistani citizen educated in the United States as a neuroscientist, was suspected of the attempted assault and killing of U.S. personnel in Afghanistan. She disappeared in 2003 with her three children. She was allegedly detained for five years at Bagram with her children; she was the only female prisoner. She was known to the male detainees as "Prisoner 650." The media dubbed her as the "Mata Hari of al-Qaida" or the "Grey Lady of Bagram." Yvonne Ridley says that Siddiqui is the "Grey Lady of Bagram" – a ghostly female detainee, who kept prisoners awake "with her haunting sobs and piercing screams". In 2005 male prisoners were so agitated by her plight, Ridley said, that they went on hunger strike for six days. Siddiqui's family maintains that she was abused at Bagram.

Binyam Mohamed

Mohamed immigrated to the U.K. from Ethiopia in 1994 and sought asylum. In 2001 he converted to Islam and travelled to Pakistan, followed by Afghanistan, to see if the Taliban-run Afghanistan was "a good Islamic country". U.S. authorities believed that he was a would-be bomber, who fought alongside the Taliban in Afghanistan. Pakistani immigration officials arrested him at the airport in April 2002 before he returned to the U.K. Mohamed has said officials have used evidence gained through torture in sites in Pakistan, Morocco and Afghanistan between 2002 and 2004 before he was "secretly rendered" to the U.S. Guantanamo Bay detention camp on Cuba. In October 2008, the U.S. dropped all charges against him. Mohamed was reported as being very ill as a result of a hunger strike in the weeks before his release. In February 2009 Mohamed was interviewed by Moazzam Begg, a fellow Bagram detainee and founder of CagePrisoners, an organization to help released detainees. Mohamad identified a photo of Aafia Siddiqui as the woman whom he and other male detainees had seen at Bagram, known as "Prisoner 650."

Others

Mohammed Sulaymon Barre, a Somali refugee who worked for a funds transfer company, described his Bagram interrogation as "torture." Barre said he was picked up and thrown around the interrogation room when he wouldn't confess to a false allegation. He was put into an isolation chamber that was maintained at a piercingly cold temperature for several weeks and deprived of sufficient rations during this period. As a result of this treatment, his hands and feet swelled, causing him such excruciating pain that he could not stand up.

Zalmay Shah, a citizen of Afghanistan, alleges mistreatment during detention at Bagram air base. An article published in the May 2, 2007 issue of The New Republic contained excerpts from an interview with Zalmay Shah. He said he had originally cooperated closely with the Americans. He had worked with an American he knew only as "Tony" in the roundup of former members of the Taliban. According to the article:

Zalmay Shah was eventually released. He said that Americans continue to ask for his cooperation, but he now declines.

Others include Mohammed Salim and Moazzam Begg.

Investigation and prosecution

In October 2004, the U.S. Army Criminal Investigation Command concluded that there was probable cause to charge 27 officers and enlisted personnel with criminal offenses in the Dilawar case, ranging from dereliction of duty to maiming and involuntary manslaughter. Fifteen of the same soldiers were also cited for probable criminal responsibility in the Habibullah case. Seven soldiers have been charged so far. According to an article published in the October 15, 2004 The New York Times 28 soldiers were under investigation. Some of the soldiers were reservists in the 377th Military Police Company under the command of Captain Christopher M. Beiring. The rest were in the 519th Military Intelligence Battalion under the command of Captain Carolyn A. Wood.

On October 14, 2004, the Criminal Investigation Command forwarded its report from its investigation to the commanders of 28 soldiers.

As of November 15, 2005, 15 soldiers have been charged.

Involved but uncharged
Some interrogators involved in this incident were sent to Iraq and were assigned to Abu Ghraib prison. PFC Corsetti was fined and demoted while assigned to Abu Ghraib for not having permission to conduct an interrogation.

Allegations of a widespread pattern of abuse

A May 2005 editorial of The New York Times noted parallels between military behavior at Bagram and the later abuse and torture of prisoners at Abu Ghraib in Iraq:

In November 2001, Col. Morgan Banks, chief psychologist of the SERE (Survival, Evasion, Resistance, Escape) program, was sent to Afghanistan. He worked for four months at Bagram. In early 2003, Banks issued guidance for the "behavioral science consultants" who helped to devise Guantánamo's interrogation strategy. He has emphatically denied having advocated use of SERE counter-resistance techniques to break down detainees.

U.S. government response

The United States government through the Department of State makes periodic reports to the United Nations Committee Against Torture. In October 2005, the report focused on pretrial detention of suspects in the War on Terrorism, including those held at Guantanamo Bay detention camp and in Afghanistan. This particular report is significant as the first official response of the U.S. government to allegations of widespread abuse of prisoners in Afghanistan and at Guantanamo Bay. The report denies the allegations.

McCain Amendment

The McCain amendment was an amendment to the United States Senate Department of Defense Authorization bill, commonly referred to as the Amendment on (1) the Army Field Manual and (2) Cruel, Inhumane, Degrading Treatment, amendment #1977 and also known as the McCain Amendment 1977. The amendment prohibited inhumane treatment of prisoners. The Amendment was introduced by Senator John McCain. On October 5, 2005, the United States Senate voted 90–9 to support the amendment, which was later signed into law by President George W. Bush.

Second secret prison

In May 2010, the BBC reported about nine prisoners who "told consistent stories of being held in isolation in cold cells where a light is on all day and night. The men said they had been deprived of sleep by US military personnel there." When the BBC sought information from the International Committee of the Red Cross about this, the ICRC revealed that it had been informed in August 2009 by US authorities that they maintained a second facility at Bagram, where detainees were held in isolation due to "military necessity." This was an exception to the principle of allowing guaranteed access for all prisoners to the International Red Cross.

Film
The 2007 documentary Taxi to the Dark Side (2007), directed by American filmmaker Alex Gibney, focuses on the murder of Dilawar by US troops at Bagram.

See also

Abu Ghraib torture and prisoner abuse
Abuse
Canadian Afghan detainee abuse scandal
Command responsibility
Criticism of the War on Terrorism
Enhanced interrogation
Iraq prison abuse scandals
International public opinion on the war in Afghanistan
Military abuse
Opposition to the War in Afghanistan (2001–2021)
Prisoner abuse
Protests against the invasion of Afghanistan
Qur'an desecration controversy of 2005
The Salt Pit
Torture and the United States
Use of torture since 1948
War in Afghanistan (2001–2021)

References

External links

Allegations of abuse and neglect at a US detention facility in Afghanistan - BBC video June 24, 2009
From Bagram to Abu Ghraib, article by Emily Bazelon, Mother Jones, March 1, 2005
U.S. 'Thumbs Its Nose' at Rights, Amnesty Says by Alan Cowell, The New York Times, May 26, 2005
Years After 2 Afghans Died, Abuse Case Falters, The New York Times, February 13, 2006
Failures of Imagination, Columbia Journalism Review, 2005, issue 5
America's Secret Afghan Prisons by Anand Gopal, February 2010
Human Rights First; Undue Process: An Examination of Detention and Trials of Bagram Detainees in Afghanistan in April 2009 (2009)
US-held detainee has become 'mentally disturbed' BBC 16 May 2010

 
George W. Bush administration controversies
Torture in Afghanistan
United States war crimes
War crimes in Afghanistan
War in Afghanistan (2001–2021)
War in Afghanistan (2001–2021) casualties
United States military scandals
Military prisoner abuse scandals